Jat'ita Patxa (Aymara Jat'iña to make a hole, to dig, -ta participle ending, patxa ridge, "ridge with a hole (or holes)" or "dug ridge", also spelled Jatitapadja, Jatipadja) is a  mountain in the Andes of southern Peru. It is located in the Moquegua Region, Mariscal Nieto Province, Carumas District. Jat'ita Patxa lies southwest of Wilaquta.

References

Mountains of Moquegua Region
Mountains of Peru